Harmon Township is one of thirty-seven townships in Washington County, Arkansas, USA. As of the 2000 census, its total population was 1,394.

Geography
The township was created from Elm Springs Township in 1908.

Cities, towns, villages
Harmon
Blewford (historical)

Cemeteries
The township contains no cemeteries.

Major routes
The township contains no state highways.

References

 United States Census Bureau 2008 TIGER/Line Shapefiles
 United States National Atlas

External links
 US-Counties.com
 City-Data.com

Townships in Washington County, Arkansas
1908 establishments in Arkansas
Townships in Arkansas